"Odio Amarte"  is the debut single by American duo Ha*Ash. It was first included on Ha*Ash's first studio album Ha*Ash (2003) where it was released as the first single on April 23, 2002 and then included on their live albums Primera Fila: Hecho Realidad (2014) and Ha*Ash: En Vivo (2019). It was written by Ashley Grace, Hanna Nicole and Áureo Baqueiro and produced by Baqueiro.

Background and release 
"Odio Amarte" was written by Ashley Grace, Hanna Nicole and Áureo Baqueiro and produced by Baqueiro. It serves as the two track to her first studio album Ha*Ash (2003), and then recorded live for his live album Primera Fila: Hecho Realidad in 2014.

Commercial performance 
The track peaked at number 2 in the Monitor Latino charts in the Mexico.

Music video 
A music video for "Odio Amarte" was released in 2003. Was published on her YouTube channel on April 24, 2010. , the video has over 20 million views on YouTube.

The second music video for "Odio Amarte" recorded live for his album "A Tiempo" edition deluxe (DVD) was released on 2012. , the video has over 5 million views on YouTube.

The third music video for "Odio Amarte", recorded live for the live album Primera Fila: Hecho Realidad, was released on May 8, 2015. It was directed by Nahuel Lerena. The video was filmed in Estudios Churubusco, City Mexico. , the video has over 54 million views on YouTube.

The four video for "Odio Amarte", recorded live for the live album En Vivo, was released on December 6, 2019. The video was filmed in Auditorio Nacional, Mexico City.

Credits and personnel 
Credits adapted from AllMusic and Genius.

Recording and management

 Recording Country: México
 Sony / ATV Discos Music Publishing LLC / Westwood Publishing
 (P) 2003 Sony Music Entertainment México, S.A. De C.V. (studio version)
 (P) 2014 Sony Music Entertainment México, S.A. De C.V. (live version)

Ha*Ash
 Ashley Grace  – songwriting, vocals, guitar (studio version / live version)
 Hanna Nicole  – songwriting, vocals, guitar (studio version / live version)
Additional personnel
 Áureo Baqueiro  – songwriting, recording engineer, arranger, director (studio version)
 Armando Ávila  – guitar, acoustic guitar, recording engineer (studio version)
 Rodolfo Cruz  – recording engineer (studio version)
 Áureo Baqueiro  – songwriting (live version)
 Pablo De La Loza  – co-producer, co-director (live version)
 George Noriega  – producer (live version)
 Tim Mitchell  – producer (live version)

Charts

Release history

References 

Ha*Ash songs
Songs written by Ashley Grace
Songs written by Hanna Nicole
Songs written by Áureo Baqueiro
Song recordings produced by Áureo Baqueiro
2002 songs
2002 debut singles
Spanish-language songs
Pop ballads
Sony Music Latin singles
2000s ballads